India will host the 2023 IBA Women's World Boxing Championships from 14 to 26 March 2023. The events are scheduled to held at K. D. Jadhav Hall.

Competitors

References 

2023 IBA Women's World Boxing Championships